Frederick Seward may refer to:

 Frederic Kimber Seward (1878–1943), prominent corporate lawyer in New York City, and survivor of the sinking of the RMS Titanic
 Frederick W. Seward (1830–1915), American Assistant Secretary of State,  son of William Henry Seward, Sr. and Frances Adeline Seward and elder brother of General William Henry Seward, Jr.